ISO 11446:2004 specifies a 13-pole electrical connector between towing and towed vehicles with 12 volt electrical system.

References
 Right Connections UK Limited
 ISO 11446 (2004)
 ISO 11446-1 (2012)
 ISO 11446-2 (2012)

DC power connectors
Automotive accessories
11446